Nimruz or Nimroz is one of the 34 provinces of Afghanistan, located in the southwestern part of the country. It lies to the east of the Sistan and Baluchestan Province of Iran and north of Balochistan, Pakistan, also bordering the Afghan provinces of Farah and Helmand. It has a population of about 186,963 people. The province is divided into five districts, encompassing about 649 villages.

The city of Zaranj serves as the provincial capital and Zaranj Airport, which is located in that city, serves as a domestic airport for the province. The recently-built Kamal Khan Dam is located in Chahar Burjak District.

The name Nimruz means "mid-day" or "half-day" in Balochi. The name is believed to indicate that the meridian cutting the old world in half passes through this region. Nimruz covers 43,000 km2. It is the most sparsely populated province in the country, located in the Sistan Basin. A substantial part of the province is the barren desert area of Dashti Margo.

In 2021, the Taliban gained control of the province during the 2021 Taliban offensive.

History

The name Zaranj was derived from Persian word ‘Zranka’ and is considered to be one of the oldest cities in Nimruz Province . The area now composing Nimruz province of Afghanistan was once part of the historical region of Sistan, which over the many centuries was held by the Achaemenid Empire, Alexander the Great and others before being conquered and converted to Islam by the Muslim Arabs in the seventh century. The region became part of the Saffarid dynasty in 860 CE with its capital at Zaranj, which was one of the first local dynasties of the Islamic era. Its founder Yaqub Saffari was born and raised in this region. The territory became part of the Ghaznavids followed by the Ghurids, Timurids, and Safavids.

In the early 18th century, the region fell to the Afghan Hotaki dynasty until they were removed from power in 1738 by Nader Shah. By 1747, Ahmad Shah Durrani made it part of Afghanistan after he conquered the territory from northeastern Iran to Delhi in India. Under the modern Afghan government, the province was known as Chakhansur Province until 1968, when it was separated to form the provinces of Nimruz and Farah. The city of Zaranj became the capital of Nimroz province at that time. During the Soviet–Afghan War, Nimruz province was used by mujahideen crossing back and forth between Afghanistan and neighboring countries. It was also used by Afghan refugees escaping the war as well as by smugglers.

As the Taliban came to power in 1995, they seized the road-controlling town of Delaram (now within Farah Province), and came to an agreement with local mujahideen commanders that the fate of the province would not be decided until a clear victor emerged in the capture of Kabul. However, the Taliban advanced on Nimruz only days later, and the mujahideen under command of Abdul Karim Brahui fled to Iran.

NATO presence and the Karzai administration

Following the US-led invasion in October 2001, the Taliban began losing control of the province to the new Afghan government under President Hamid Karzai. The area is historically known for drugs and weapons smuggling between Afghanistan, Iran and Pakistan. Many foreign militants also use the province to go back and forth between the 3 nations. The Delaram–Zaranj Highway was built by the Indian government in 2009, which is one of the main trade routes in the country and is expected to boost the socio-economic development in the province.

Since 2002, members of the U.S. Marine Corps were present in the province. When the International Security Assistance Force (ISAF) arrived at Kandahar, Nimruz province became part of the Regional Command Southwest. The local Afghan National Security Forces (ANSF) are being trained by these forces. ISAF is also involved in development activities.

Healthcare

The percentage of households with clean drinking water fell from 38% in 2005 to 24% in 2011.
The percentage of births attended to by a skilled birth attendant increased from 7% in 2005 to 28% in 2011.

Education

The overall literacy rate (6+ years of age) increased from 22% in 2005 to 23% in 2011. 
The overall net enrolment rate (6–13 years of age) increased from 33% in 2005 to 49% in 2011.

Transport and economy

As of June 2014 Zaranj Airport which is located near the city of Zaranj had regularly scheduled flights to Herat.

The Delaram–Zaranj Highway has been constructed by India via Chaknasur, which is expected to boost the socio economic development in the region.

Trade, farming, and herding is the main source of income for the majority. This includes agriculture and animal husbandry. Animals include sheep, goat, cattle, and poultry. The province produces the following: Wheat, corn, melons, poppies; almost all irrigated.

Nimruz has always been isolated the past. This led to one author in 2010 calling it Afghanistan's "forgotten province." Historically, the territory served as a major smuggling hub due to its border with Iran and Pakistan. The province became popular after the trade route between Iran and Afghanistan became operational, which provides another large income to the Afghan government.

Geography
The Sistan Basin dominates the province. Many parts of the south are covered by the Godzareh depression which includes marshes and dry lakes.

Demography 

The NSIA puts the population of Nimruz Province at approximately 186,963 people. This estimate includes the many Kuchi nomads who inhabit the province seasonally and the native settled people. It is the only province of Afghanistan where the Baloch ethnic group forms a majority. The Balochs are followed by Pashtun, Brahui, Tajik, Uzbek, and Hazara. The Pashtun tribes are mostly Barakzai and Nurzai. Almost all inhabitants except Hazaras follow Sunni Islam. Languages spoken in the province are Pashto, Dari and Balochi.

Population by districts

See also
Provinces of Afghanistan

References

External links

Nimroz Province by Naval Postgraduate School

 
Provinces of Afghanistan
Provinces of the Islamic Republic of Afghanistan